Rich Good (born 17 June 1974) is a British musician and recording artist. His first recognized musical work was as a songwriter and founding member of San Francisco band The Pleased, alongside Joanna Newsom, Noah Georgeson, Genaro Vergoglini, Luckey Remington and Jason Clark.

Career
Since the split of the Pleased, he concentrated on own project Kings & Queens, and released three albums The Dream Ends in Fury (2006), Like a Warning (2008) and Jet in Carina (2010). Good also played slide guitar on Bert Jansch's The Black Swan, produced by Georgeson of the Pleased.

He is currently the guitarist for The Psychedelic Furs and has a project named Mirrors in San Francisco. He lives in Wonder Valley, California.

References

English rock guitarists
English male guitarists
People from Crawley
1974 births
Living people
21st-century British guitarists
21st-century British male musicians